Partula tristis is a species of air-breathing tropical land snail, a terrestrial pulmonate gastropod mollusk in the family Partulidae. This species was endemic to Ra'iātea, French Polynesia. It is now extinct in the wild. It is informally known as the mournful tree snail.

References

Partula (gastropod)
Taxonomy articles created by Polbot
Gastropods described in 1953